Johann Christoffel van Graan (born 18 March 1980) is a South African rugby union coach, currently the head coach for Bath.

Coaching career

Van Graan did not have any top level playing career. With family background in rugby, he showed very strong interest in analysis from an early age.

2004–2011 : Bulls and Blue Bulls

Van Graan started as a technical adviser for the Blue Bulls rugby team, initially working with their Vodacom Cup team, before moving into the same role with their Currie Cup team and the Bulls Super Rugby (then known as Super 14) team. He moved into a role as the teams' forwards and attack coach, helping the Bulls win three Super 14 titles in 2007 (under head coach Heyneke Meyer) and 2009 and 2010 (under Frans Ludeke).

2012–2017 : South Africa

He joined the Springboks coaching setup in 2012 as a technical adviser, where he again linked up with Heyneke Meyer. He became known for his attention to detail, utilising video analysis, and soon saw his role progressed to that of forwards coach. In the coaching restructure post-2015 Rugby World Cup, Van Graan was the only member of the coaching team to survive, and he continued in his role under new Springboks head coach Allister Coetzee.

2017–2022 : Munster

In October 2017, it was confirmed that Van Graan would be leaving South Africa to join Irish Pro14 side Munster as their new head coach. He replaced outgoing Director of Rugby Rassie Erasmus, who was returning to South Africa. His first game with Munster was a 36–19 win away to Zebre in the Pro14 on 26 November 2017, although he officially took charge of the side the day after. He signed a two-year contract extension with Munster and the IRFU in April 2019. Van Graan left Munster upon the conclusion of the 2021–22 season.

Bath

Van Graan joined English Premiership club Bath on a long-term contract from the 2022–23 season.

Personal life

He is the son of Barend van Graan, the long-serving CEO of the Blue Bulls Rugby Union.

References

Living people
1980 births
South African rugby union coaches
White South African people
Munster Rugby non-playing staff